Save the World is the third studio album by British hard rock band Geordie.

Cover
The font used to spell "Save the World" on the album's front cover would in the late 1970s be utilized by British heavy metal band Iron Maiden for their now-famous logo.

Track listing 
All tracks 1976 Red Bus Records, except 2, 11 and 12, 1974 Red Bus Records, 3 and 9, 1975 Red Bus Records.

Personnel 
Brian Johnson - vocals
Vic Malcolm - guitar
Tom Hill - bass
Brian Gibson - drums
Micky Bennison - guitar

References 

1976 albums
Geordie (band) albums
EMI Records albums